is a Japanese football player. He plays for Kyoto Sanga FC.

Career
Takahiro Iida joined J1 League club Shimizu S-Pulse in 2017.

Club statistics
Updated to 20 July 2022.

References

External links
Profile at Shimizu S-Pulse

1994 births
Living people
Senshu University alumni
Association football people from Ibaraki Prefecture
People from Sakuragawa, Ibaraki
Japanese footballers
J1 League players
J2 League players
Shimizu S-Pulse players
Kyoto Sanga FC players
Association football defenders